Vocational Training Centre Revillagigedo is a work of the Jesuits in Gijon, Asturias, Spain. Early through higher grade vocational training courses are offered following the regulations for vocational training in Spain.

See also
 List of Jesuit sites

References  

Universities and colleges in Spain
Jesuit universities and colleges in Spain
Educational institutions established in 1929
1929 establishments in Spain